Hermann Plaskuda (6 April 1879 – 21 March 1918) was a German fencer. He competed in four events at the 1912 Summer Olympics. He was killed in action during World War I.

See also
 List of Olympians killed in World War I

References

1879 births
1918 deaths
German male fencers
Olympic fencers of Germany
Fencers at the 1912 Summer Olympics
German military personnel killed in World War I
20th-century German people